Lee William "Flame" Delhi (November 5, 1892 – May 9, 1966) was a pitcher in Major League Baseball. He played one game for the Chicago White Sox in 1912. Delhi was the first Arizona-born player to appear in the major leagues. The Arizona chapter of the Society for American Baseball Research (SABR) is named for him.

References

External links

1892 births
1966 deaths
Major League Baseball pitchers
Chicago White Sox players
Los Angeles Angels (minor league) players
San Francisco Seals (baseball) players
Great Falls Electrics players
Kansas City Blues (baseball) players
Baseball players from Arizona